Marta Valeryevna Martyanova (born 1 December 1998) is a Russian right-handed foil fencer and 2021 team Olympic champion.

Career 

Martyanova began fencing in 2006 and became a member of the Russian national team in 2015. Martynanova participated in the team women's foil event at the 2021 Tokyo Olympic Games as a replacement athlete. She replaced Adelina Zagidullina in the semifinal match against the United States due Zagidullina's poor performance against American Lee Kiefer.

In the third period of the gold medal match against France, Martyanova was fencing Pauline Ranvier when she fell and injured her left ankle; however, she continued fencing and eventually helped the team to win gold.

Medal record

Olympic Games

World Championship

European Championship

Grand Prix

References

Living people
Russian female foil fencers
1998 births
Fencers at the 2020 Summer Olympics
Olympic fencers of Russia
Olympic medalists in fencing
Fencers at the 2014 Summer Youth Olympics
Medalists at the 2020 Summer Olympics
Olympic gold medalists for the Russian Olympic Committee athletes
Sportspeople from Kazan
21st-century Russian women